Noemi Signorile (born 15 February 1990) is an Italian professional volleyball player who played with her national team at the 2014 World Championship.

Career
Signorile played with her national team at the 2014 World Championship. There her team ended up in fourth place after losing 2–3 to Brazil the bronze medal match.

Clubs
  Chieri Volley (2005–2006)
  Club Italia (2006–2008)
  Esperia Cremona (2008–2009)
  Verona Volley (2009–2010)
  Volley Bergamo (2010–2012)
  Robursport Volley Pesaro (2012–2013)
  Pallavolo Ornavasso (2013–2014)
  AGIL Volley (2014–2016)

Awards

Clubs
 2010 FIVB Club World Championship— Bronze medal, with Volley Bergamo
 2010–11 Italian Championship -  Champions, with Volley Bergamo
 2011 Italian Supercup -  Champions, with Volley Bergamo
 2014–15 Italian Championship -  Runner-Up, with AGIL Volley
 2015 Italian Cup— Champions, with AGIL Volley
 2016–17 CEV Cup -  Runner-Up, with Busto Arsizio

References

1990 births
Italian women's volleyball players
Living people
Sportspeople from Turin
Italian expatriate sportspeople in Romania
Expatriate volleyball players in Romania
Competitors at the 2013 Mediterranean Games
Mediterranean Games gold medalists for Italy
Mediterranean Games medalists in volleyball